Big Lake is a lake in Edmonton metropolitan region, Canada. It is located adjacent to the northwest corner of Edmonton and the southwest corner of St. Albert. Its primary inflow is the Sturgeon River.

Atim Creek flows into Big Lake from the west and Carrot Creek from the north.

Big Lake is home to as much as 235 different types of birds. The western bay of the lake provides rare nesting habitat for Franklin's gulls. The Lois Hole Centennial Provincial Park is established on the shore of the lake.

History
Big Lake's name comes from the Cree Indians of the area, who named the lake on account of its size.

Alberta Fish and Wildlife considers Big Lake to be one of the 20 most important habitat areas in Alberta. In May 1999, the Alberta Government created the Big Lake Natural Area comprising 1,119 hectares of lake and wetlands. On June 5, 2001 the lake became an Important Bird Areas site. In 2005 Big Lake became Alberta's newest Provincial Park, named Lois Hole Centennial Provincial Park.

See also 
Big Lake, Edmonton
List of Alberta provincial parks
List of Canadian provincial parks

Notes

References 
Big Lake and Sturgeon River

Lakes of Alberta
Big Lake
Landforms of Edmonton
Parkland County
Sturgeon County